The Festivals of the Twin Birthdays or the Twin Holy Birthdays refers to two successive holy days in the Baháʼí calendar that celebrate the births of two central figures of the Baháʼí Faith. The two holy days are the birth of the Báb on the first day of Muharram in the Islamic calendar (20 October 1819) and the birth of Baháʼu'lláh on the second day of Muharram (two years prior, on 12 November 1817).

They are observed on the first and the second day following the occurrence of the eighth new moon after Naw-Rúz, as determined in advance by astronomical tables using Tehran as the point of reference. This results in the observance of the Twin Birthdays moving, year to year, within the months of Mashíyyat, ʻIlm, and Qudrat of the Baháʼí calendar, or from mid-October to mid-November in the Gregorian calendar.

Prior to 2015 and a decision by the Universal House of Justice, these two holy days had been observed on the first and second days of Muharram in the Islamic lunar calendar in the Middle East, while other countries observed them according to the Gregorian calendar on 20 October (for the birth of the Báb) and 12 November (for the birth of Baháʼu'lláh).

On the occasion of the 200th anniversaries of the births of the Báb and Baháʼu'lláh in 2017 and 2019, special celebrations were organized worldwide. In October 2017 the Universal House of Justice sent a letter to "all who celebrate the Glory of God", on the meaning of Baháʼu'lláh's life and current Baháʼí activities, inspired by the 200th anniversary of his birth.

Observance

Days in the Baha'i calendar begin at sunset. In the following table, the Baha'i date should be understood as starting at sunset on the day before the first Gregorian date listed for each year.

Significance
The notion of "twin Manifestations of God" is a concept fundamental to Baháʼí belief, describing the relationship between the Báb and Baháʼu'lláh. Both are considered Manifestations of God in their own right, having each founded separate religions (Bábism and the Baháʼí Faith) and revealed their own holy scriptures. To Baháʼís, however, the missions of the Báb and Baháʼu'lláh are inextricably linked: The Báb's mission was to prepare the way for the coming of Him whom God shall make manifest, who eventually appeared in the person of Baháʼu'lláh. For this reason, both the Báb and Baháʼu'lláh are revered as central figures of the Baháʼí Faith. A parallel is made between Baháʼu'lláh and the Báb as between Jesus and John the Baptist.

In the Kitáb-i-Aqdas, Baháʼu'lláh wrote that his birthday and that of the Báb "are accounted as one in the sight of God".

References

External links
 Universal House of Justice: Regarding the implementation of the Badiʻ calendar
 Baháʼí World Centre (2017). Days of Remembrance – Selections from the Writings of Baháʼu'lláh for Baháʼí Holy Days.
 Official website of the Bicentenary of the Birth of Baháʼu'lláh (2017)
 Official website of the Bicentenary of the Birth of the Báb (2019)

Bahá'í holy days
October observances
November observances